Lectka and co-workers developed a catalytic, asymmetric method to synthesize β-lactams.

Achiral ketenes and imines, in the presence of a chiral nucleophilic catalyst, are allowed to react to make β-lactams in high yields, enantioselectivities, and diastereoselectivities.

The proton sponge acts as a base to deprotonate the α-proton to the carbonyl in order to generate the ketene.

Cinchona alkaloids (BQ and BQd) are readily available and relatively inexpensive natural products that have features making them useful asymmetric organocatalysts. The quinoline and quinuclidine rings are sterically demanding groups that can induce a high degree of stereoselectivity. The tertiary amine contained within the quinuclidine can act as a nucleophile that attacks the most electrophilic carbon of the ketene to promote the formation of β-lactams.

Chiral ketene enolate formation via nucleophilic activation by the cinchona alkaloid facilitates enantioselective and diastereoselective β-lactam synthesis. Unlike the Staudinger β-lactam synthesis, the umpolung ketene in the Lectka β-lactam synthesis behaves as the nucleophile rather than the electrophile. Similarly, the imine in the Lectka synthesis behaves as the electrophile rather than the nucleophile as seen in the Staudinger β-lactam synthesis. The chiral ketene enolate nucleophile attacks electrophilic carbon of the imine group. Subsequent ring closure leads to the formation of the β-lactam and the regeneration of the chiral nucleophilic organocatalyst.

References
 
 

Heterocycle forming reactions
Name reactions